Kaikaifilusaurus is an extinct genus of rhynchocephalians in the family Sphenodontidae from the Late Cretaceous of South America. Fossils of the genus were found in Cenomanian sediments of the Candeleros Formation and Turonian layers of the Huincul Formation, both of the Neuquén Basin and the Albian strata of the Cerro Barcino Formation in the Cañadón Asfalto Basin, all in Patagonia, Argentina. The genus contains two species, K. minimus and the type species K. calvoi.

Etymology 
The genus name Kaikaifilusaurus is derived from the Greek sauros, meaning "lizard" and Kaikaifilu, coming from Mapudungun, the language of the Mapuche. In their cosmology, Kai-Kai filú is the almighty giant reptile owner of the seas, a rival of Treng-Treng filú, "both creators of the lands through their continuous fight that causes the earthquakes, volcanoes, tsunamis and all the events that molded the earth where we live". The same etymology has been used for the mosasaur genus Kaikaifilu from the Lopez de Bertodano Formation of Antarctica.

Classification 
The present type species of Kaikaifilusaurus, K. calvoi, was described by Simón and Kellner in 2003, based on type specimen MPCHv 4, a mandible (left lower jaw) from the Candeleros Formation. In the same year, Priosphenodon avelasi was described by Apesteguía and Novas in 2003, based on type specimen MPCA 300, a partially articulated adult skeleton from the Cenomanian fluvial sandstones of the Candeleros Formation in the Neuquén Basin.

Gentil et al. in 2019 reassigned P. avelasi as a junior synonym of Kaikaifilusaurus calvoi. Gentil et al. placed the second species of Priosphenodon, P. minimus, in 2014 described by Apesteguía and Carballido based on the type specimen MPEF-PV 3166, a skull (almost complete skull with attached jaws, from the Albian Cerro Barcino Formation of the Cañadón Asfalto Basin, in the same genus of Kaikaifilusaurus as K. minimus. Apesteguía and Carballido had considered Kaikaifilusaurus a nomen dubium.

The 2019 researchers described another specimen of Kaikaifilusaurus; MPCA-PV 808, an incomplete right dentary from the Turonian strata of the Huincul Formation of the Neuquén Basin.

Gentil et al. (2019) place the genus Kaikaifilusaurus in the subfamily Eilenodontinae of the order Sphenodontia.

Description 

Adult specimens of Kaikaifilusaurus are estimated to reach  in length, larger than previously known terrestrial sphenodontian.

Paleoecology 
The fossil record of Kaikaifilusaurus ranges from the Albian to the Turonian, straddling the boundary between the Early and Late Cretaceous. The oldest record (the K. minimus type locality) of the genus comes from the La Paloma Member of the Cerro Barcino Formation of the Cañadón Asfalto Basin in north-central Patagonia, Argentina. During this time, the paleoclimate of the La Paloma Member of the formation was arid, and the depositional environment comprised a playa lake with debris flows system, dominated by pyroclastic deposits with intercalated dune sediments. The same member has provided fossils of Chubutemys copelloi and an indeterminate theropod.

The fossil remains of Kaikaifilusaurus from the Candeleros Formation hail from Cenomanian fluvial red sandstones and conglomerates. The formation comprises eolian and paleosol deposits, as well as sediments deposits in a braided river environment. Fossils of one of the largest theropods known, Giganotosaurus carolinii were found in this succession, as well as frogs, mammals and fish.

The youngest record of the genus occurs in the Huincul Formation, overlying the Candeleros Formation in Neuquén Basin. The formation represents an arid environment with ephemeral or seasonal streams. The same locality where Kaikaifilusaurus was found, has provided abundant fossils of lepisosteid fish, chelid turtles, lizards, neosuchian crocodyliforms, ornithopods, titanosaurian sauropods and diverse theropods including abelisaurids, carcharodontosaurids, and megaraptorans. The dinosaurs Gualicho shinyae, Argentinosaurus huinculensis, Mapusaurus rosae, Cathartesaura, Ilokelesia, and Skorpiovenator bustingorryi, come from this formation.

See also 
 Lamarquesaurus

References

Bibliography 
Kaikaifilusaurus
 
 
 
 
 

Paleoecology

Further reading 
 

Cretaceous lepidosaurs
Albian life
Cenomanian life
Turonian life
Early Cretaceous reptiles of South America
Late Cretaceous reptiles of South America
Cretaceous Argentina
Fossils of Argentina
Candeleros Formation
Cerro Barcino Formation
Huincul Formation
Fossil taxa described in 2003
Taxa named by Alexander Kellner